Anthony Beane (born May 6, 1994) is an American professional basketball player who is currently playing for the Indonesian Patriots of the Indonesian Basketball League.

College career
Beane played college basketball at Southern Illinois University, with the Southern Illinois Salukis, from 2012 to 2016.

Professional career
Beane played with Lukoil Acamedic, of the Bulgarian League. With Academic, he won the Bulgarian League championship, in 2017.

On August 11, 2020, Beane signed with Virtus Roma in Italy's Lega Basket Serie A.

After Virtus Roma's withdrawal from the Serie A due to financial problems, Beane, like all the Roma players, was made free agent. On December 14, 2020, he has signed with Pallacanestro Varese of the Italian Lega Basket Serie A (LBA).

On January of 2023, Beane was reportedly been tapped as the import of the Indonesian Patriots for their season campaign. In his first game with the Patriots, he recorded 28 points and 6 rebounds in a 61–63 losing campaign over the Satria Muda.

References

External links
 at Eurobasket.com
 at RealGM.com
 at ESPN.com

1994 births
Living people
American expatriate basketball people in Belgium
American expatriate basketball people in Bulgaria
American expatriate basketball people in Indonesia
American expatriate basketball people in Latvia
American expatriate basketball people in Poland
American men's basketball players
Basketball players from Illinois
BK Ventspils players
Legia Warsaw (basketball) players
Pallacanestro Varese players
PBC Academic players
People from Normal, Illinois
Point guards
Shooting guards
Southern Illinois Salukis men's basketball players
Spirou Charleroi players